Medical evacuation, often shortened to medevac or medivac, is the timely and efficient movement and en route care provided by medical personnel to wounded being evacuated from a battlefield, to injured patients being evacuated from the scene of an accident to receiving medical facilities, or to patients at a rural hospital requiring urgent care at a better-equipped facility using medically equipped air ambulances, especially helicopters.

Examples include civilian EMS vehicles, civilian aeromedical helicopter services, and military air ambulances. This term also covers the transfer of patients from the battlefield to a treatment facility or from one treatment facility to another by medical personnel, such as from a local hospital to a trauma center.

History

The first medical transport by air was recorded in Serbia in the autumn of 1915 during First World War. One of the ill soldiers in that first medical transport was Milan Rastislav Štefánik, a Slovak pilot-volunteer who was flown to safety by French aviator Louis Paulhan.

The United States Army used this lifesaving technique in Burma toward the end of World War II with Sikorsky R-4B helicopters. The first helicopter rescue was by 2nd Lt Carter Harman, in Japanese-held Burma, who had to make several hops to get his Sikorsky YR-4B to the 1st Air Commando Group's secret airfield in enemy territory and then made four trips from there between April 25 and 26 to recover the American pilot and four injured British soldiers, one at a time.  The first medivac under fire was done in Manila in 1945 when five pilots evacuated 75-80 soldiers one or two at a time.

See also 
 Aeromedical evacuation
 Air ambulance
 Casualty evacuation
 Global Rescue, provider of medical evacuation services.
 "Medevac bill" (Australia, 2019)
 Medivac, Australian television series
 Shock Trauma Air Rescue Society

References

External links

 Association of Air Medical Services
 Landing in Hell: Army Medevac Today - slideshow by Life magazine

Air ambulance services
Critical emergency medicine
Military medicine
Evacuations